John Iain Stephen Sergeant (born 27 February 1995) is a Gibraltarian footballer who currently plays for Lincoln Red Imps and the Gibraltar national team, as a defender.

Club career
Sergeant appeared for Sevilla FC's youth setup, and had a stint with Atlético Zabal before graduating from AD Taraguilla. In the 2013 summer, he moved to Manchester 62. In summer 2016 he moved to England to study  a fire and rescue management degree at Blackburn College awarded by Lancaster University.

On 17 August 2017, after a year out of the game, he signed for Lincoln Red Imps. On 30 October 2017, Sergeant signed for West Didsbury & Chorlton. For his performances, in which he played 24 games for the club, he was awarded Manager's Player of the Year in May 2018. In July he briefly played for Lincoln Red Imps for their UEFA Europa League campaign before completing his spell at West. During his final year at the club, he shared a house in Hulme with international and West teammate Jamie Coombes. After spending a season at Europa upon his return to the Rock, in July 2020 he re-signed for Lincoln.

International career
After appearing and captaining the Gibraltar U19's, Sergeant made his debut with the full squad on 19 November 2013, in a 0–0 draw against Slovakia.

After being uncapped since 2016, when he moved to the UK, Sergeant returned to the national team in March 2018 for the friendly against Latvia. He played the full game, getting booked late on, as Gibraltar held on for a historic 1–0 victory. In doing so, he also set a record as first West Didsbury & Chorlton player to be capped while at the club in their 109 year history. He captained the side for the first time in a 4–1 defeat to Montenegro on 27 March 2021.

Career statistics

International

Honours
Lincoln Red Imps
Gibraltar National League: 2020–21

References

External links

 
 
 

1995 births
Living people
Gibraltarian footballers
Gibraltar international footballers
Gibraltarian expatriate footballers
Gibraltar Premier Division players
Association football defenders
Europa F.C. players
Lincoln Red Imps F.C. players
Manchester 62 F.C. players
West Didsbury & Chorlton A.F.C. players
Gibraltar youth international footballers
Gibraltarian expatriate sportspeople in England
Gibraltarian expatriate sportspeople in Spain